Sanchai Nontasila (สัญชัย นนทศิลา; born 30 March 1996) is a Thai professional footballer who plays as a left back for Thai League 1 club Police Tero.

References

External links
 
 at Soccerway

1996 births
Living people
Sanchai Nontasila
Sanchai Nontasila
Sanchai Nontasila
Association football defenders